Kaliska  (formerly ) is a village in Starogard County, Pomeranian Voivodeship, in northern Poland. It is the seat of the gmina (administrative district) called Gmina Kaliska.

For details of the history of the region, see History of Pomerania.

The village has a population of 2,189.

References

Kaliska